Samarium(III) iodide is an inorganic compound, a salt of samarium and hydroiodic acid with the chemical formula .

Synthesis
Samarium(III) iodide is prepared by the reaction of metallic samarium and iodine:
2Sm + 3I2 -> 2SmI3

Properties
Samarium(III) iodide is a yellow powder that is unstable in air and decomposes in water (hydrolysis). When heated with metallic samarium, it forms samarium diiodide:
2SmI3 + Sm ->[\Delta] 3SmI2 

Reduction by hydrogen also affords samarium diiodide:
2SmI3 + H2 ->[\Delta] 2SmI2 + 2HI

Applications
The compound is commercially available and used in organic reactions as a catalyst.

References

Samarium compounds
Iodides
Inorganic compounds
Lanthanide halides